Sidney Fox may refer to:

 Sidney Fox, American actress
 Sidney Harry Fox (d.1930), British matricide
 Sidney W. Fox, American biochemist

See also
 Sydney Fox, fictional character